Lebedinsky Oil Plant is a Ukrainian oil refining enterprise. The company was founded in late 1994 with the support of the Ukrainian Research Institute of Oil Refining Industry "Masma" (Kyiv) on the basis of a former military facility as a company with a modern name. The design production capacity was 50 thousand tons per year.

See also

 List of oil refineries
 Azov Lubricants and Oils

References

Companies established in 1995
Companies of Ukraine by city
Economy of Ukraine by city
History of Sumy Oblast
Oil refineries in Ukraine